Wolfgang Kummer can refer to:

 Wolfgang Kummer (bobsledder) (1914-1988), German bobsledder
 Wolfgang Kummer (ice hockey) (born 1970), German ice hockey player